John Harris (born 1839, date of death unknown) was a Union Navy sailor who received the Medal of Honor for his service on  in Mobile Bay during the American Civil War.

Born in 1839, Harris was living in New York when he joined the Navy. Despite intense fire, the boat crew was able to pull ten Tecumseh men from the water. For this action, Harris was awarded the Medal of Honor a year and a half later, on January 15, 1866. Five other members of the boat crew also received the medal: Seaman James Avery, Quarter Gunner Charles Baker, Ordinary Seaman John C. Donnelly, Seaman Henry Johnson, and Landsman Daniel Noble.

Medal of Honor citation
As captain of the forecastle on board the U.S.S. Metacomet, Harris was a member of the boat's crew which went to the rescue of the officers and crew of the U.S. Monitor Tecumseh, when that vessel was struck by a torpedo in passing the enemy forts in Mobile Bay, 5 August 1864 Harris braved the enemy fire which was said by the admiral [ David Farragut ] to be "one of the most galling" he had ever seen, and aided in rescuing from death 10 of the crew of the Tecumseh, thereby eliciting the admiration of both friend and foe.

See also
 List of Medal of Honor recipients
 Battle of Mobile Bay

Notes

References

External links

Year of death missing
1839 births
United States Navy Medal of Honor recipients
Union Navy officers
United States Navy officers
American Civil War recipients of the Medal of Honor